Marina Likhanova (born 27 October 1990) is a Russian professional racing cyclist.

Major results

2012
 2nd Overall Tour of Adygeya
2013
 10th Overall Tour of Adygeya
2014
 4th Overall Tour of Adygeya
 8th Grand Prix de Oriente
2015
 4th Grand Prix of Maykop
 7th Overall Tour of Adygeya

See also
 List of 2015 UCI Women's Teams and riders

References

External links

1990 births
Living people
Russian female cyclists
Place of birth missing (living people)